George McDonald is a New Zealand former rugby league footballer who represented New Zealand in the 1954 World Cup.

Playing career
McDonald played in the Waikato Rugby League competition and represented Waikato. He made his debut for the New Zealand national rugby league team in 1954 at the inaugural World Cup. McDonald was selected to go on the 1955–56 New Zealand rugby tour of Great Britain and France. He played in six test matches for New Zealand, playing his last in 1955 against France.

References

Living people
New Zealand rugby league players
New Zealand national rugby league team players
Waikato rugby league team players
Rugby league second-rows
Year of birth missing (living people)